O07 may refer to:

Microsoft Office 2007
Westheimer Air Park, FAA code

See also

007 (disambiguation)
o7 (disambiguation)